Lindha Kallerdahl, (born Lindha Svantesson 27 September 1972) is a Swedish Jazz singer, married to the pianist and composer Fabian Kallerdahl.

Honors 
 2001: Jazz in Sweden Award
 2003: Sten A Olssons Cultural Scholarship
 2015: Hedersgäst vid Umeå Jazzfestival

Discography 

 As Lindha Svantesson
 1999: Röd (AMiGO)
 2001: Far From Alone (Caprice Records)
 2003: 9 Swans Repeat (Naxos)

 As Lindha Kallerdahl
 2007: Gold (ESP Disk)
 2009: Skoddeheimen (NorCD), Kallerdahl / Seglem / Ulvo / Hole / Sjøvaag
 2012: Let’s Dance (Hoob Records)
 2014: Gold Quintet Solo (Hoob Jazz)

References

External links 
 
 

1972 births
Living people
Swedish jazz singers
21st-century Swedish singers
NorCD artists